The Chapada dos Veadeiros Microregion is an IBGE statistical region in north-central Goiás state, Brazil.

Municipalities 
The microregion consists of the following municipalities:

Economic Data

Health and education

Statistics
Largest area:  Cavalcante with 6,979.5 km²
Smallest area:  Teresina de Goiás with 777.5 km²
Greatest population:  Campos Belos with 18,238 (2007)
Smallest population: Teresina de Goiás with 2,773 (2007)
Highest population growth rate 1996/2007:  São João d'Aliança with 2.91%
Lowest population growth rate 1996/2007: Nova Roma with -1.06%
Lowest score on the Municipal Human Development Index: Cavalcante with  0.609
Highest score on the Municipal Human Development Index:  Alto Paraíso de Goiás with 0.738
Highest literacy rate:  Alto Paraíso de Goiás with 86.4 (2000)
Lowest literacy rate: Cavalcante with 61.7 (2000)
Highest infant mortality rate:  Monte Alegre de Goiás with 45.34 in every 1,000 live births (2000)
Lowest infant mortality rate:  Alto Paraíso de Goiás with 26.56 in every 1,000 live births (2000)
Highest GDP: Cavalcante with 171,000,000 Reais (2005)
Lowest GDP: Teresina de Goiás with 8,800,000 Reais (2005)
Highest per capita GDP: Cavalcante with 17,549 Reais (2005)
Lowest per capita GDP:  Teresina de Goiás with 2,652 Reais (2005)
Greatest cattle herd:  Monte Alegre de Goiás with 121,200 head (2006)
Greatest production of soybeans:  São João d'Aliança with 60,000 tons (2007)
Greatest production of corn: São João d'Aliança with 49,500 tons (2007) Source:  Estatísticas Municipais

See also
List of municipalities in Goiás
Microregions of Goiás

References

Microregions of Goiás